The 2014 season is Cruzeiro's ninety-third season in existence and the club's forty-fourth consecutive season in the top flight of Brazilian football.

Squad

Source: Cruzeiro Official Web Site

Under-20 players called up to professional squad

Statistics

Appearances and goals

Last updated: 22 Out 2014
Source: Match reports in Competitive matches

Starting XI

4–5–1 Formation

<div style="position: relative;">

Goal scorers

Last updated: 2 Nov 2014

Disciplinary record

Includes all competitive matches.

Club

Coaching staff

Transfers

In

Out

Overview

Friendlies

Competitions

Campeonato Mineiro

First stage

Semi-finals

Finals

Copa Libertadores

Group 5

Round of 16

Quarterfinals

Campeonato Brasileiro

Results summary

Matches

Copa do Brasil

Round of 16

Quarterfinals

Semifinals

Final

References

External links
 

Cruzeiro Esporte Clube seasons
Cruzeiro